Neobidessodes bilita is a carnivorous subterranean water beetle, in the Bidessini tribe of the Dytiscidae family. It was first described in 1978 by Chris H.S. Watts as Bidessodes bilita, and reassigned to the genus  of Neobidessodes in 2009 by Hendrich and others. 

It is found in Victoria, the New South Wales and Queensland.

References

Dytiscidae
Beetles of Australia
Beetles described in 1978